Harmony Hall Plantation, located in White Oak, is one of the oldest residences in North Carolina

History
Harmony Hall was built by Col. James Richardson prior to 1768. The 12,000 to  plot it originally occupied on the banks of the Cape Fear River was partially a grant from King George III for Col. Richardson's gallant service with General James Wolfe in the French and Indian War. The Colonel became interested in the land after he and his brother were shipwrecked off of Cape Hatteras and had to spend several months making repairs in Bladen County, NC before they could return to their home in Stonington, Connecticut. The building is frame built in a two-story Gabled style with two-story galleries, an unusually tall foundation with ventilation holes, and exterior stairs leading from the second story to a full attic. The interior is partially paneled with wide pine boards, some with chair-rails and some plastered above a paneled dado. The mantels are modeled after the Adam design. Shortly after completing the construction, Col. James was captured by the British army during the Revolutionary War and paroled. However, after learning of many British soldiers breaking their parole, he too broke his and re-enlisted in the American Army.

It was added to the National Register of Historic Places in 1972.

Cornwallis legend
In a local legend associated with the home, General Cornwallis used Harmony Hall as his headquarters for a time during his march to Wilmington, North Carolina.  According to the legend, one night he and his staff were planning  their campaign against General Greene in an upstairs bedroom when Mrs. Richardson crept up the exterior stairwell and eavesdropped through a hole in the ceiling, overhearing their plans.  After creeping back down, she dispatched the plantation overseer to warn General Greene, allowing him to defeat Cornwallis.  However, careful historical analysis has shown that although General Cornwallis marched within several miles of Harmony Hall, he was always on the opposite side of the Cape Fear River.  There is no historical evidence to suggest that he crossed the river at any time.  The legend may have some truth, as there is a chance that the Richardson ladies relocated during the war and had contact with General Cornwallis at some different location, but there is no way to determine this.

After the Revolutionary War
Harmony Hall remained in the hands of the Richardson family until Col. James' grandson, Captain Edmund Richardson, moved to Texas and sold it to unknown parties in 1865.  In 1874 it passed into the hands of the Layton family, who owned it from that point until 1962, when the property was given to the Bladen County Historical Society by N. Arthur Layton, Jr., of Winter Haven, Florida as a memorial to his parents and Col. James A. Richardson.

Property and grounds
In addition to the home itself, there are several other buildings on the property.  There is a schoolhouse, two restored country stores, a chapel, corn-crib, external kitchen, log cabin, and a gatehouse, most of which were not originally on the property and were relocated and restored.  There is also a small cottage, used as a caretaker's cabin.  A short way across the river is located the Purdie-Richardson family cemetery, although the property no longer belongs to the home.

References

Further reading
Franklin and Mary Wickwire, Cornwallis and the American Adventure (1970)
John Buchanan, The Road to Guilford Courthouse:  The American Revolution in the Carolinas (1996)
John S. Pancake, This Destructive War:  The British Campaign in the Carolinas, 1780-1782 (1985)
Ray Flowers, "John A Richardson, 1826-1872, Reluctant Lieutenant Colonel of the 36th NC" Newsletter of the Cape Fear Civil War Roundtable, Wilmington, NC, May 2004
Compiled Service Record, John A. Richardson, National Archives, Washington, DC (microfilm copy, North Carolina State Archives)

External links
 Harmony Hall Plantation - Facebook site
Harmony Hall Village - White Oak https://www.harmonyhallwhiteoaknc.com/

Houses on the National Register of Historic Places in North Carolina
Houses completed in 1768
Houses in Bladen County, North Carolina
National Register of Historic Places in Bladen County, North Carolina
Museums in Bladen County, North Carolina
Historic house museums in North Carolina
1768 establishments in North Carolina